Root won Game of the Year.

Academy Awards
The following are the winners of the 45th annual (2019) Origins Award:

Fan Favourites

Academy of Adventure Gaming Arts & Design Hall of Fame 
The academy enlisted two designers and games in Academy of Adventure Gaming Arts & Design Hall of Fame.

 Gerald Brom, Writer/Illustrator
 Vladimír Chvátil, Designer/Co-founder Czech Games Edition
 Mage Knight Board Game
 Apples to Apples

Rising Star Award
Jamey Stegmaier won a new award of Rising Star.

References 

2019 awards
Origins Award winners
2019 awards in the United States